Lawsonia intracellularis is a species of bacterium. It is obligately intracellular and was isolated from intestines of pigs with proliferative enteropathy disease.

Pathogenicity
Lawsonia intracellularis is highly pathogenic. The species has been associated with outbreaks of bacterial infection-associated protein losing enteropathy in horses.

References

Further reading

Husnik, R., et al. "Lawsonia intracellularis in a dog with inflammatory bowel disease." Veterinarni Medicina-UZPI 48 (2003).

External links

Thermodesulfobacteriota